Levasy is a city in Jackson County, Missouri, United States. The population was 83 at the 2010 census. It is part of the Kansas City metropolitan area.

History
A post office called Levasy has been in operation since 1877. The city was named after William Wallace Livesay, an early settler.

Geography

Demographics

2010 census
At the 2010 census there were 83 people in 39 households, including 27 families, in the city. The racial makup of the city was 97.6% White and 2.4% from two or more races. Hispanic or Latino of any race were 3.6%.

Of the 39 households, 20.5% had children under the age of 18 living with them, 56.4% were married couples living together, 5.1% had a female householder with no husband present, 7.7% had a male householder with no wife present, and 30.8% were non-families. 28.2% of households were one person, and 10.3% were one person aged 65 or older. The average household size was 2.13 and the average family size was 2.56.

The median age was 50.3 years. 14.5% of residents were under the age of 18; 4.7% were between the ages of 18 and 24; 24% were from 25 to 44; 39.7% were from 45 to 64; and 16.9% were 65 or older. The gender makeup of the city was 48.2% male and 51.8% female.

2000 census
As of the census of 2000, there were 108 people in 40 households, including 33 families, in the city. The population density was 187.1 people per square mile (71.9/km2). There were 46 housing units at an average density of 79.7 per square mile (30.6/km2). The racial makup of the city was 99.07% White and 0.93% Native American.

Of the 40 households, 25.0% had children under the age of 18 living with them, 70.0% were married couples living together, 7.5% had a female householder with no husband present, and 17.5% were non-families. 17.5% of households were one person, and 7.5% were one person aged 65 or older. The average household size was 2.70 and the average family size was 2.97.

In the city the population was spread out, with 24.1% under the age of 18, 5.6% from 18 to 24, 29.6% from 25 to 44, 25.0% from 45 to 64, and 15.7% 65 or older. The median age was 42 years. For every 100 females, there were 107.7 males. For every 100 females age 18 and over, there were 105.0 males.

The median household income was $51,250 and the median family income was $60,250. Males had a median income of $40,000 versus $24,688 for females. The per capita income for the city was $17,016. There were 3.2% of families and 5.1% of the population living below the poverty line, including 3.3% of under eighteens and 23.1% of those over 64.

References

Cities in Jackson County, Missouri
Cities in Missouri